Trombidium clavipes is a fossil species of mite in the genus Trombidium in the family Trombidiidae. It was found in Oligocene deposits.

Name
The species name is derived from Latin clav- "club" and pes "foot".

References
 Synopsis of the described Arachnida of the World: Trombidiidae

Further reading
  (1854): Die im Bernstein befindlichen Crustaceen, Myriapoden, Arachniden und Apteren der Vorwelt.

Trombidiidae
Fossil taxa described in 1854
Oligocene arthropods
Oligocene animals of Europe